The yellow bass (Morone mississippiensis) is a member of the family Moronidae. This species is a deep bodied fish that possesses five to seven dark stripes laterally along the sides, the lowest few of these are often broken or disrupted anterior to the origin of the anal fin. This species is somewhat similar to two other species in the family Moronidae, the white bass and the striped bass. The yellow bass is distinguishable from both of these species by having the offset lateral stripes above the anal fin and from not possessing tooth patches on the tongue. The yellow bass differs further from the white bass by having nine to ten anal rays in comparison to eleven or thirteen. The back of the fish is usually a dark olive green, and the abdomen and sides are often a silvery yellow.

Diet
Food exploited by young yellow bass include small invertebrates including copepods and aquatic insects. The juvenile yellow bass feeds almost exclusively on aquatic insects and crustaceans, and once they reach adulthood they feed primarily on other small fishes; the rest of their diet consists of small crustaceans.

Habitat and distribution
Yellow bass may be found in somewhat clear waters of the Mississippi River from Minnesota to Louisiana and may also be found in the Trinity River and the Tennessee River. The yellow bass can also be found in lakes surrounding these rivers, especially in areas with dense vegetation and low turbidity.

Reproduction and life cycle
The reproductive biology of the yellow bass is similar to that of the white bass, where spawning occurs during the spring with fish swimming into the tributaries to make spawning runs. Spawning usually occurs in moderately shallow waters during which the female lies on her side and exposes the eggs as the male fertilizes from above. The larvae of the yellow bass school together to avoid predation and they grow fairly quickly in size. Yellow bass have average lifespan of about six years.

Importance to humans
The yellow bass is not as popular a gamefish as either the white bass or the striped bass because of its small size. They are usually caught by anglers fishing with crappie jigs or minnows. These fish may also be caught in large numbers because of their large populations. The yellow bass is edible and this fish is commonly eaten in its range.

The International Game Fish Association world record yellow bass, caught in the Morse lake in Indiana in 2000, weighed 2lbs 15oz.

Etymology
The specific name, mississippiensis, comes from the Mississippi River.

References

External links

 Animal Texas Parks and Wildlife - Yellow Bass (Morone mississippiensis)
 NatureServe Explorer - Morone mississippiensis

Morone
Fish of the Great Lakes
Fish described in 1887
Taxa named by David Starr Jordan